The 1st The Beatz Awards was held at Muson Center in Lagos on December 17, 2015. Nominees were revealed on November 13, 2015. The live show was televised on STV, Nigezie TV, wapTV, TVC and BEN Television, with host Gordons, and Angel Ufuoma.

Performers

Presenters
Gordons
Angel Ufuoma

Nominations and winners
The following is a list of nominees and the winners are listed highlighted in boldface.

References

2015 music awards
2015 awards